Senator Montford may refer to:

Bill Montford (born 1947), Florida State Senate
John T. Montford (born 1943), Texas State Senate